Peder Vogt (born 11 February 2000) is a Norwegian football defender who plays for Stabæk.

Hailing from Hosle, he went from Øvrevoll Hosle to Stabæk at the age of 13. Progressing through the youth teams, he made his senior league debut in April 2019 against Bodø/Glimt, and also featured in the first three 2019 Norwegian Football Cup rounds. When the 2020 Eliteserien commenced, he was a starter on left back, since Jeppe Moe was injured.

References

2000 births
Living people
Sportspeople from Bærum
Norwegian footballers
Stabæk Fotball players
Eliteserien players
Association football defenders